The Roman Catholic Diocese of Tucson is an ecclesiastical territory or diocese of the Roman Catholic Church in the southwestern region of the United States. It is a suffragan see of the Metropolitan Archdiocese of Santa Fe. The diocese was recently led by its seventh bishop, Most Reverend Gerald Frederick Kicanas, who retired on October 3, 2017. Its current diocesan bishop is Most Rev. Edward Weisenburger. 

The See city for the diocese is Tucson, Arizona, and its cathedral parish is the St. Augustine. Another church of special interest is the Mission San Xavier del Bac, also in Tucson.

Extent 
It comprises nine counties of the state of Arizona, making it the fifth largest diocese in the continental United States in terms of area. The counties are Gila, Graham, Greenlee, Pinal (excluding the territorial boundaries of the Gila River Indian Community), Cochise, Santa Cruz, Pima, Yuma, and La Paz.

History 
Pope Pius IX established the Apostolic Vicariate of Arizona in 1868, taking its territory from the then Diocese of Santa Fe.

The Diocese of Tucson was canonically erected by Pope Leo XIII as a diocese on May 8, 1897.

It lost territory thrice: on 3 March 1914 to establish the Diocese of El Paso, on 16 December 1939 to establish the Diocese of Gallup and on 28 June 1969 to establish the Diocese of Phoenix.

Sexual abuse scandal

The Diocese of Tucson filed for Chapter 11 bankruptcy in September 2004, becoming the second Catholic Diocese to do so in United States history. The Diocese of Tucson reached an agreement with the victims of sex abuse, which the bankruptcy judge approved on June 11, 2005, specifying terms that included allowing the diocese reorganization to continue in return for a $22.2 million settlement. In 2013, Stephanie Innes of the Arizona Daily Star labeled the Diocese as a "dumping ground" for abusive priests after it was revealed that several accused clergy from other Catholic Dioceses were sent to the Diocese of Tucson when accusations of sex abuse started gaining traction. In 2018, Tucson Bishop Edward J. Weisenburger confirmed that 10 Catholic clergy who were accused of committing acts of sex abuse had been removed from the Diocese of Tucson "in the last decade."

On December 31, 2020, a federal RICO lawsuit was filed against the Roman Catholic Diocese of Tucson which alleged that the Diocese used the Roman Catholic Archdiocese of Los Angeles in the neighboring state of California as a "dumping ground" for accused clergy who were reported to have committed acts of sex abuse while serving in the Diocese of Tucson. In March 2021, it was revealed another plaintiff was added to the lawsuit, which had been filed against both Dioceses.

Bishops

Apostolic Vicars of Arizona
 Jean-Baptiste Salpointe (1868–1884), appointed Coadjutor Archbishop and later Archbishop of Santa Fe
 Peter Bourgade (1885–1897)

Bishops of Tucson
 Peter Bourgade (1897–1899), appointed Archbishop of Santa Fe
 Henry Regis Granjon (1900–1922)
 Daniel James Gercke (1923–1960)
 Francis Joseph Green (1960–1981)
 Manuel Duran Moreno (1982–2003)
 Gerald Frederick Kicanas (2003–2017)
 Edward Weisenburger (2017–present)

Coadjutor Bishops
 Francis Joseph Green (1960)
 Gerald Frederick Kicanas (2001–2003)

Other priest of this diocese who became Bishop
 Thomas Joseph O'Brien, appointed Bishop of Phoenix in 1981, resigned in disgrace, 2003, convicted of felony of hit and run involving death, 2004.

High schools 
 Immaculate Heart High School, Oro Valley
 Lourdes Catholic School, Nogales
 St. Augustine Catholic High School, Tucson
 San Miguel High School, Tucson
 Yuma Catholic High School, Yuma

Other dioceses in Arizona 
 Roman Catholic Diocese of Phoenix
 Roman Catholic Diocese of Gallup

Parishes and missions by county

Cochise County

 Our Lady of Lourdes, Benson
 St Andrew the Apostle, Sierra Vista
 Our Lady of the Mountains, Sierra Vista
 Sacred Heart of Jesus, Tombstone
 Sacred Heart of Jesus Church, Willcox
 St Jude Thaddeus Parish,
 St Patrick Parish, Bisbee
 St Michael, Naco
 St Bernard, Pirtleville
 Immaculate Conception, Douglas
 St Luke, Douglas

Gila County
 St Philip the Apostle Parish, Payson
 St Benedict, Young
 Our Lady of the Blessed Sacrament, Miami
 Holy Angels, Globe
 San Carlos Apache Community, San Carlos
 St Joseph, Hayden

Graham County
 Our Lady of Guadalupe Parish, Solomonville
 St Rose of Lima, Safford
 St Martin de Porres, Pima

Greenlee County
 Holy Cross, Morenci
 Sacred Heart, Clifton
 St Mary, Duncan

La Paz County
 Sacred Heart Parish, Parker
 Queen of Peace Mission, Quartzsite
 St John the Baptist Mission, Wenden
 Blessed Kateri Tekakwitha Mission, Poston

Pima County

 Corpus Christi Parish, Tanque Verde
 Holy Family Parish, Tucson
 Most Holy Trinity Parish, Tucson
 Our Lady of Fátima Parish, Drexel Heights
 Our Lady of LaVang Vietnamese Catholic Church, Tucson
 Our Lady Queen of all Saints Parish, Tucson
 Our Mother of Sorrows Parish, Tucson
 Queen of Angels Parish, Tucson
 Sacred Heart, Tucson
 St Ambrose Parish, Tucson
 St. Augustine Cathedral, Tucson
 St Cyril of Alexandria Parish, Tucson
 St Elizabeth Ann Seton Parish, Casas Adobes
 St Frances Cabrini Parish, Tucson
 St Francis de Sales Parish, Tucson
 St John the Evangelist Parish, Tucson
 St Joseph Parish, Tucson
 St. Kateri Tekakwitha Parish, South Tucson
 St Margaret Mary Alacoque Parish, Tucson
 St Mark Parish, Oro Valley
 St Melany's Byzantine Church, Tucson
 St Monica Parish, Tucson
 St Odilia Parish, Oro Valley
 St Pius X Parish, Tucson
 Ss Peter and Paul Parish, Tucson
 St Thomas More Newman Center, Tucson
 St Thomas the Apostle Parish, Catalina Foothills
 San Xavier del Bac Mission and Parish, San Xavier Indian Reservation
 Santa Catalina Parish, Catalina
 Santa Cruz Parish, Tucson
 San Martín Mission
 Santa Rosa Mission
 Cristo Rey Mission
 San Ignacio de Loyola Mission
 El Señor de los Milagros Mission
 San Juan Bautista Mission

_
 St. Christopher Parish, Marana
 Immaculate Conception Parish, Ajo
 Our Lady of the Sacred Heart, Sells
 San Solano Missions/Parish, Topowa
 St Augustine Mision, Chuichu
 San José Mission, Pisenemo
 Our Lady of the Valley Parish, Green Valley
 San Martín de Porres Parish, Sahuarita
 St. Rita in the Desert Parish, Vail

Pinal County
 St George Parish, Apache Junction
 Assumption of the Blessed Virgin Mary Parish, Florence
 St James Parish, Coolidge
 Our Lady of Grace Parish, Maricopa
 St Michael the Archangel, Florence
 St Anthony of Padua Parish, Casa Grande
 St Francis of Assisi Parish, Superior
 St Helen of the Cross, Eloy
 St Helen, Oracle
 St Bartholomew, San Manuel
 Blessed Sacrament, Mammoth
 Infant Jesus of Prague, Kearny
 St Mary Mission, Stanfield

Santa Cruz County
 St. Ann's Parish, Tubac
 Most Holy Nativity of Our Lord Jesus Christ Parish, Rio Rico
 San Felipe de Jesús Parish, Nogales
 Sacred Heart Parish, Nogales
 St Therese of Lisieux Parish, Patagonia

Yuma County
 St Jude Thaddeus, San Luis
 Immaculate Heart of Mary, Somerton
 Immaculate Conception Parish, Yuma
 St Francis of Assisi Parish, Yuma
 St John Neumann Parish, Yuma
 St Joseph Mission, Wellton

See also 

 Catholic Church by country
 Catholic Church in the United States
 Ecclesiastical Province of Santa Fe
 Global organisation of the Catholic Church
 List of Roman Catholic archdioceses (by country and continent)
 List of Catholic dioceses (alphabetical) (including archdioceses)
 List of Catholic dioceses (structured view) (including archdioceses)
 List of the Catholic dioceses of the United States

References

Sources and external links
 Roman Catholic Diocese of Tucson Official Site
 GigaCatholic with incumbent biography links
 Arizona Catholic Conference
 St. Gianna Oratory, Institute of Christ the King in Tucson 

 
Diocese of Tucson
Roman Catholic
Culture of Tucson, Arizona
Roman Catholic dioceses and prelatures established in the 19th century
1897 establishments in Arizona Territory
Tucson
Companies that filed for Chapter 11 bankruptcy in 2004